Dear Mom may refer to:

 Dear Mom (Glenn Miller song)
 Dear Mom (Girls' Generation song)
 Dear Mom (Brooke Hogan song)